Alkermes may refer to:

Alkermes (company), a biopharmaceutical company
Alchermes, a red liqueur coloured by inclusion of the insect Kermes vermilio

See also
Kermes (disambiguation)